Very Necessary is the fourth studio album by American hip hop group Salt-N-Pepa, released on October 12, 1993, by Next Plateau Records and London Records. The album spawned four singles, including "Shoop" (their first top-five single on the Billboard Hot 100, peaking at number four), "Whatta Man" (featuring En Vogue, their second-highest-peaking single at number three), and "None of Your Business", which would earn the group their first Grammy Award, in the category Best Rap Performance by a Duo or Group.

Very Necessary peaked at number four on the Billboard 200, and has been certified five-times platinum by the Recording Industry Association of America (RIAA), denoting sales in excess of five million copies in the United States.

Track listing

Notes
  signifies a co-producer
  signifies a remixer
  signifies an additional producer
 On international editions of the album, "I've Got AIDS (PSA)" is retitled "PSA We Talk".

Samples
 "Whatta Man" contains a sample of "What a Man" by Linda Lyndell.
 "Shoop" contains samples from "I'm Blue" by the Sweet Inspirations and "Super Sporm" by Captain Sky.
 "Heaven or Hell" contains portions of "Heaven and Hell Is on Earth" by 20th Century Steel Band and "Think About It" by Odell Brown & the Organ-izers.

Charts

Weekly charts

Year-end charts

Certifications

Notes

References

1993 albums
Albums produced by Hurby Azor
London Records albums
Next Plateau Entertainment albums
Pop-rap albums
Salt-N-Pepa albums